Cyclanthera pedata, known as caigua, is a herbaceous vine grown for its edible fruit, which is predominantly used as a vegetable. It is known from cultivation only, and its use goes back many centuries as evidenced by ancient phytomorphic ceramics from Peru depicting the fruits.

Origin and distribution
Not known in the wild, but presumably native to the Andes where it has been traditionally cultivated.

Description
Cyclanthera pedata is a vine that can be 12 m long; the stems are thin; and the leaves can be up to 24 cm long, palmate or pedate in shape. The small flowers can be greenish or white and are borne in racemes. The fruit is light green, ovoid, curved, up to 15 cm long, almost hollow (except for the seeds and a thin flesh layer), with smooth skin or sometimes covered in soft spines; the seeds are black.

Cultivation
Cyclanthera pedata is grown at small scale farming in mountain areas of Mexico, Central America and South America. It is sometimes cultivated in Asia. This species can be grown in mountain areas up to 2000, being adapted to cool temperatures.

Vernacular names 
Known in the Andes as caigua or caihua (possibly from Quechua kaywa); also as achocha (possibly from Quechua achuqcha). In English it is named stuffing cucumber or slipper gourd. In Costa Rica it is called Jaiva. In Darjeeling, India, it is called Chuchay Karela. In Chinese, it is known as 小雀瓜.

Uses

Food
The fruits are eaten after removing the seeds and stuffing them with other foods like rice or meat, and then cooking them. Young shoots and leaves can also be eaten as greens. The fruits are a source of potassium, magnesium and phosphorus. Fruit flavor is similar to cucumber crossed with green bean or otherwise tasteless.

Chemistry 
The fruits contain flavonoid glycosides of which four show an antioxidant effect.

Caigua fruits generally exhibit high antioxidant activity but a low total phenolic content, which indicates that non-phenolic water-soluble compounds might be involved. Flavonoids are present in this cyclanthera species, which have antioxidant properties as well and were shown that with a high intake are correlated to a decrease in heart disease.

Dried samples of caigua showed α-amylase inhibition and relevant ACE inhibitory activities.

A negative aspect of caigua is, that the seeds contain a group of trypsin inhibitors, which negatively affect protein absorption.

Other chemicals in the Caigua include triterpenoid saponins and the seeds have been reported with six cucurbitacin glycosides. as well as 28-30 amino acids.

Archaeology 

The Moche culture often depicted this species in their ceramics. Remains of this species have also been found buried in archaeological sites on the Peruvian coast.

References

pedata
Fruit vegetables
Crops originating from Peru
Plants described in 1753
Taxa named by Carl Linnaeus